Ad Dahi District is a district of the Al Hudaydah Governorate, Yemen. In 2003, the district had a population of 54,503.

Cities 

 Ad-Dahi

Geography
The district contains the hills Jabal al Maḩāriq, Jabal al Minjārah, Jabal al Qāhirī, Kabbat al Ḩamrā' and Kabbat al Manşabah, and the wadis Wādī al Mūsīyah, Wādī Kusr and Wādī Namir.

References

Districts of Al Hudaydah Governorate